The Interceltic Festival of Avilés (FIA) is a summer arts festival held annually in Avilés, and the surrounding area in Asturias, Spain since 1997. The festival is held to promote the cultural traditions, and developments, of the Celtic nations (países celtes in Asturias), especially music and dance, as well as painting, photography, theatre, sculpture, traditional craftsmanship, sport and gastronomy. It is organized by the Cultural Association Esbardu, located in Avilés.

Background
The idea of a festival in Avilés arose after the Festival Interceltique de Lorient in 1993 when members of Esbardu took part in that festival. They started working on a similar (although smaller) idea in Avilés. In the summer of 1997 the project received a small budget from the Asturian regional government and another one from Avilés Town Hall. The festival was held again in the following year.

In 2006, 1,175 people took part in the festival with 150 acts and performances over eleven days. There were 800 musicians, dancers and actors in the parade. In 2008 it was officially named by the Regional Authorities of the Principality of Asturies, as the "Fiesta de Interés Turístico Regional"(Celebration of Regional Tourist Interest).
In 2010 choirs from Wales participated in the festival, namely The Port Talbot Cymric Male Choir and Cor Meibion Y Fflint (Flint Male Voice Choir). The 'Cymric' as it is known, was the first Welsh male voice choir to perform at the 'Festival Interceltique de Lorient' and performed again in 1978. The choir was again invited to Lorient in 1992. Flint have appeared at Lorient five times as well as Interceltic Festivals in Nantes and Paris. They were winners of the Male Voice Choir competition in the 2007 Côr Cymru, and finalists again in 2009.

Venue 
The festival takes place in the Comarca de Avilés, in Asturias, between Cabo Peñas and the mouth of the Nalón river. Avilés, Castrillón, Corvera and Illas are the members of the Comarca.

FIA 2008 
From 18 to 27 July 2008, the festival was held in Avilés and Comarca.
Las Noches Célticas (The Celtic Nights):

Asturias
La Bandina de la Curuxa
Falanuncaduca
Anabel Santiago and M.Lee Woolf

Brittany
Merzhim
Bagad Lann Bihoué
Korriganed Panvrid

Gales
Dawnswyr Tawerin

Galicia
Inquedanzas
B.G. Charamuscas de Bembrive

Ireland
Beoga
Classac

Scotland
Fred Morrison
The Tannahill Weavers
Culter and District Pipe Band
The Red Hot Chilli Pipers

FIA 2007
Participants in the 11th festival included 
Curran - Fegan from Ireland
Inquedanzas from Tui Pontevedra, Galicia
Banda de Gaitas Ledicia from Sanguiñeda Mos, Pontevedra
Dawnswyr Môn folk dancers from Anglesey, Wales
The Red Hot Chilli Pipers from Scotland
Pitlochry and Blair Atholl Pipe Band from Scotland
Capercaillie a folk band from Scotland
Ballocheam Highland Dancers from Stirlingshire, Scotland
Bagad Landi from Brittany
Lann Tivizio from Brittany
Cultural Association Esbardu: Organizers of the Festival
Xera from Asturias
La Bandina from Asturias
Dúo Astur from Asturias

Images

See also
 Interceltic Festival of Morrazo, Galicia
 Festival Interceltique de Lorient, France

References

External links

 Interceltic Festival of Avilés Official Website
Esbardu Official website
Comarca Avilés
Festival Interceltique de Lorient Official Website

Asturian culture
Music festivals in Spain
Festivals established in 1997
Tourist attractions in Asturias
Celtic music festivals
Folk festivals in Spain
1997 establishments in Spain